Karolina Kumięga (born 16 April 1999) is a Polish professional racing cyclist. She rode in the women's road race event at the 2020 UCI Road World Championships.

References

External links
 

1999 births
Living people
Polish female cyclists
Place of birth missing (living people)
21st-century Polish women